"Summer Breeze" is a song written and originally recorded by American soft rock duo Seals and Crofts. Released in 1972, it reached No. 6 on the Billboard Hot 100 chart in the US. In 2013, it was ranked No. 13 in Rolling Stone′s "Best Summer Songs of All Time".  The song also became a hit for The Isley Brothers in 1974.

Original Seals and Crofts version
Released nine days ahead of their 1972 Summer Breeze album, Seals and Crofts' original version reached No. 6 on the Billboard Pop Singles chart in the US that same year. Bruce Eder of AllMusic referred to it as "one of those relentlessly appealing 1970s harmony-rock anthems ... appropriately ubiquitous on the radio and in the memory".

Seals and Crofts performed the song live on the Bobby Darin Amusement Company variety show in 1972.

Harvey Brooks played bass on this recording.

Chart performance

Weekly charts

Year-end charts

Isley Brothers version

The song was covered in a harder rock-soulful style by The Isley Brothers as a single in 1974. Issued also on their 1973 album 3 + 3, it reached number sixty on the pop chart, number ten on the R&B chart, and number sixteen on the UK Singles Chart. 

The Isley Brothers performed "Summer Breeze" on the music TV show Soul Train in 1974. It was featured in season 8, episode 18 of The Blacklist and also in a 2014 episode of Scandal. It was sampled in the track "All in My Mind" by MC Hammer along with his newly formed rap group, Oakland Fight Club featuring Mistah F.A.B. (2014).

Certifications

Chart performance

Ray Conniff version
The Ray Conniff Singers recorded a version in 1973, which appeared on the I Can See Clearly Now (aka Clair) album, and was released in the UK as a 45 on the CBS label (S CBS 1196) in January 1973.

Geoffrey Williams version
The version recorded by English singer Geoffrey Williams was released in 1992 as a single. It peaked at number 56 on the week ending August 16, 1992, on the UK Singles Chart. It also peaked at number 32 on the week ending November 22, 1992, on New Zealand's Official Top 40 Singles chart.

Type O Negative version

Type O Negative released a cover of the song in August 1993 on their album Bloody Kisses altering their version to match their gothic metal style. Their version was originally to be titled "Summer Girl", featuring new lyrics written by Peter Steele, but after Seals & Crofts found the lyrical content distasteful, the original lyrics were sung instead.

The song is featured in the opening of the 1997 horror hit, I Know What You Did Last Summer.

Tracklist
All songs written by Peter Steele unless otherwise noted.

Credits
 Peter Steele – lead vocals, bass guitar
 Kenny Hickey – guitar, backing vocals
 Josh Silver – keyboards, backing vocals
 Sal Abruscato – drums, percussion

References

1972 songs
1972 singles
1974 singles
1992 singles
1995 singles
Seals and Crofts songs
Songs written by James Seals
The Isley Brothers songs
Warner Records singles
T-Neck Records singles
Roadrunner Records singles